Pilodeudorix anetia, the Hulstaert's fairy playboy, is a butterfly in the family Lycaenidae. It is found in eastern Nigeria, Cameroon, the Republic of the Congo, the Democratic Republic of the Congo, Uganda, north-western Tanzania and Zambia. The habitat consists of primary forests.

References

Butterflies described in 1924
Deudorigini